Apreece may refer to:

Apreece baronets, a title in the Baronetage of Great Britain created for Thomas Apreece
Jane Apreece (1780–1855), British heiress and socialite

See also
Rhys#The patronymic form